L'Ouragan is a 1901 opera by Alfred Bruneau to a libretto by Émile Zola.

Recording
 Gisele Desmoutiers, Camille Mauranne, Berthe Monmart, Pierre Gianotti, Nadine Sauterreau, Orchestre de la Radio Lyrique de Paris, Eugene Bigot 1957

References

Operas
1901 operas
French-language operas
Operas by Alfred Bruneau
Operas set in France